The Era of Manifestations was a period from 1837 to the mid-1850s when Shakers came under a spiritual revival marked by visions and ecstatic experiences among the followers. They expressed their visions in song, dance and drawings.

Overview

The Shaker movement was at its height between 1820 and 1860. It was at this time that the sect had its most members, and the period was considered its "golden age". It had expanded from New England to the Midwestern states of Indiana, Kentucky and Ohio. It was during this period that it became known for its furniture design and craftsmanship. In the late 1830s a spiritual revivalism, the Era of Manifestations was born. It was also known as the "period of Mother's work", for the spiritual revelations that were passed from the late Mother Ann Lee.

Spiritual revelations
The Era of Manifestations began at Watervliet, New York, in 1837 and soon spread throughout Shaker society. For instance, The Era of Manifestations, also called "Mother Ann's Work", was a part of Shaker life in New Lebanon, New York, and Hancock, Massachusetts. Ann Lee's followers testified that she had many "spiritual gifts," including visions, prophecy, healing hands, and "the power of God" in her touch. The Shakers appreciated the revival tradition and brought those practices into Shaker worship.

According to Shaker tradition, heavenly spirits came to earth, bringing visions, often giving them to young Shaker women, who danced, whirled, spoke in tongues, and interpreted these visions through their drawings and dancing. The immense spirituality expressed through visions and spiritual inspiration, with periodic revivals of enthusiastic worship, revitalized their meetings.

Children told of visits to cities in the spirit realm and brought messages from Mother Ann to the community. Members had visions, spoke in tongues, and experienced trance states. In 1841, a spiritual message was perceived to inaugurate the "sweeping gift," or spiritual cleansing of the village. Other messages led the Shaker Ministry to outlaw the use of pork, tea, and coffee, causing dissension rather than the union Shakers valued.

In the effort to "purify" the society, visionists expelled some believers from the society. At Canaan, New York, a sister recalled that they "scorched" some sluggards into leaving. In other locations, members who appeared blameless were forced to leave without any revealed infraction.

In 1842, due to these unprecedented spiritual messages being received, the Ministry decided to bar the public from Shaker worship. The same year, Shakers set aside sacred places in each community, with names like Holy Mount and Mount Sinai, for "mountain meetings" or "mountain feasts" held spring and fall. Other revelations resulted in publishing visionary Philemon Stewart's A Holy, Sacred and Divine Roll and Book.

Initially, the period had an effect of strengthening spiritual fervor and helped them to maintain their Shaker principles of simplicity, utility and honesty. The spiritual manifestations were particularly embraced by the younger members of the sect. Over time, though, the older members were increasingly disenchanted. In 1845 the sect revised their guiding edicts, the Millennial Laws, making them stricter. The laws dictated household and life practices, such as limiting mirror size and defining the allowed color of bed linens. After the revision of laws, some "believers" left the Shakers.

Gift drawings
Several pieces of art were created as part of the manifestation in New Lebanon, New York, and Hancock, Massachusetts. These were called "gift drawings" and depicted visions received by the Shakers during this time.

They were made with "painstaking precision" using watercolors or transparent inks. They generally included many small emblems, considered "wildly extravagant by Shaker standards," such as treasure chests, heavenly mansions, golden chariots, flowers and fruits. and included written messages of friendship or reverence, with calligraphic intricacies, resembling fine lacework. Generally, works would not be signed by the artist.

The tree of life has become an icon to represent Shakers. Some of these "drawings" are now part of the American Folk Art Museum collection. Key artists from the Shaker community were Hannah Cohoon, Polly Collins and Joseph Wicker; others include Sarah Bates and Polly Anne Reed. The Era of Manifestations ended when Shaker community members became embarrassed by the "emotional excesses and mystical expressions of this period."<ref name="Schorch">David A. Schorsch and Ruth Wolfe. [http://www.afanews.com/articles/item/1641-a-cutwork-tree-of-life-in-the-manner-of-hannah-cohoon#.Uy8LfIXJH4A A Cutwork Tree of Life in the manner of Hannah Cohoon.] AFANews. February 23, 2013. Retrieved March 23, 2014.</ref>

References

Further reading
 Wergland, Glendyne R. “Validation in the Shaker Era of Manifestations: A Process Analysis.” Communal Societies''. Volume 26.2 (2006): 121–40.

Shakers
Christian revivals